The Wimer Bridge is a covered bridge over Evans Creek in Jackson County in the U.S. state of Oregon. The version that was listed on the National Register of Historic Places, was built in 1927. The creek is a tributary of the Rogue River, which it joins at the small city of Rogue River.

An earlier covered span, built in 1892 by J. W. Osbourne, crossed the creek at this location, according to local residents and an engineering database. The 1927 bridge replaced the older span.

After the 1927 bridge deteriorated, local residents refurbished it in 1962. However, by the mid-1970s the bridge was closed after further decline. Repairs in 1985 led to reopening with an eight-ton limit, later reduced to three tons. Before further repairs were undertaken, the structure collapsed in 2003. It fell  into the water, injuring three people who were crossing the bridge.

In 2008, with the help of federal funds and local labor, the bridge was replaced with a look-alike using trusses reinforced with metal braces, laminated beams that look like timber, concrete approaches, and industrial roofing made to resemble wooden shakes. This version of the bridge opened to traffic in February 2008.

See also
List of bridges on the National Register of Historic Places in Oregon
List of Oregon covered bridges

References

External links
Official Website

Trip Advisor: The Wimer Covered Bridge

Bridges completed in 1927
Bridges completed in 1892
Bridges completed in 2008
Transportation buildings and structures in Jackson County, Oregon
Covered bridges on the National Register of Historic Places in Oregon
Wooden bridges in Oregon
Tourist attractions in Jackson County, Oregon
National Register of Historic Places in Jackson County, Oregon
Road bridges on the National Register of Historic Places in Oregon
Queen post truss bridges in the United States